Batraz Soslanovich Khadartsev (born 23 May 1993) is a Russian professional football player. He plays as a left midfielder for FC Alania Vladikavkaz.

Career
He played for FC Alania Vladikavkaz in the 2012–13 Russian Cup game against FC Tyumen on 27 September 2012. He made his Russian Football National League debut for Alania on 7 July 2013 in a game against FC Ufa.

On 26 June 2015, Khadartsev signed a three-year contract with FC Anzhi Makhachkala. He made his Russian Premier League debut for Anzhi on 19 July 2015 in a game against PFC Krylia Sovetov Samara.

Career statistics

Club

Notes

References

External links
 Player page by sportbox.ru  
 

1993 births
Sportspeople from Vladikavkaz
Ossetian people
Ossetian footballers
Living people
Russian footballers
Russia under-21 international footballers
Association football midfielders
PFC CSKA Moscow players
FC Spartak Vladikavkaz players
FC Tosno players
FC Anzhi Makhachkala players
FC Metalurgi Rustavi players
FC Baltika Kaliningrad players
Russian Premier League players
Russian First League players
Russian Second League players
Erovnuli Liga players
Russian expatriate footballers
Expatriate footballers in Georgia (country)
Russian expatriate sportspeople in Georgia (country)